Xu or XU may refer to:

People and characters
 Xu (surname), one of two Chinese surnames ( or /), transliterated as Xu in English 
 ǃXu, a name for the ǃKung group of Bushmen; may also refer to the ǃKung language or the ǃKung people
 ǃXu (god), the creator god of the ǃKung
 Xu, a minor character in the game Final Fantasy VIII

Places
 Xu (state), a state of ancient China
 Xǔ (state), was a vassal state of the Zhou dynasty

Universities
 X University (Toronto Metropolitan University aka Ryerson Polytechnic Institute), Toronto, Ontario, Canada
 Xavier University (disambiguation)
 Xavier University in Cincinnati, United States
 Xavier University of Louisiana, United States
 Xiamen University, Xiamen, Fujian, China
 Xinjiang University, Ürümqi, Xinjiang, China

Other uses
 African Express Airways (IATA code XU), a Kenyan airline
 X unit (symbol xu), a unit of length approximately equal to 0.1 pm (10−13 m), used for X-ray and gamma ray wavelengths
 Xu (currency), a former 1/100 subdivision of the Vietnamese Dong
 XU (intelligence organisation), a clandestine intelligence organisation in occupied Norway during World War II
 PSA XU engine, a series of petrol engines from PSA

See also

 
 HSU (disambiguation)